The Mitsubishi AAM-3 (Type 90 air-to-air missile) is a short-range all-aspect air-to-air missile developed in Japan. It has been officially operated since 1991, and is expected to ultimately replace the US AIM-9 Sidewinder.

Operators

Japan Air Self-Defense Force
F-15J Eagle
Mitsubishi F-2
F-4EJ Kai

Specifications

 Length: 3.1 m
 Diameter: 127 mm
 Weight: 91 kg
 Guidance: Infrared homing
 Range: 13 km
 Speed: Mach 2.5

See also
AAM-1
AAM-2
AAM-4
AAM-5 - replacement missile

References

 Duncan S. Lennox & Arthur Rees: Jane's Air-Launched Weapons, Issue 5, Janes Information Group
 Keith Atkin: Jane's Electro-Optic Systems, Sixth Edition 2000–2001, Janes Information Group

External links
 AAM-3 auf  Mitsubishi Heavy Industries.co.jp (eng)
 AAM-3 auf janes.com 
 FAS AAM-3

AAM-3
Military equipment introduced in the 1990s